Dewberry is a historic home located at Beaverdam, Hanover County, Virginia. It was built in 1833, and is a five-part Palladian-plan brick dwelling. It consists of a two-story, three-bay, hip-roofed, central block connected to two-story flanking wings by one-story, one-bay hyphens.  Also on the property are contributing formal gardens, a small brick outbuilding, and slave quarters.

It was listed on the National Register of Historic Places in 1996.

References

External links

Dewberry, Little River vicinity, Gum Tree, Hanover County, VA: 3 photos at Historic American Buildings Survey

Houses on the National Register of Historic Places in Virginia
Palladian Revival architecture in Virginia
Houses completed in 1833
Houses in Hanover County, Virginia
National Register of Historic Places in Hanover County, Virginia
Historic American Buildings Survey in Virginia
Slave cabins and quarters in the United States